This is a list of State Protected Monuments listed by the Archaeological Survey of India (ASI) in the Indian union territory of Jammu and Kashmir. 

The monument identifier is a combination of the abbreviation of the subdivision of the list (state, ASI circle) and the numbering as published on the website of the ASI. 28 State Protected Monuments have been recognized by the ASI in Jammu and Kashmir. Besides the State Protected Monuments, there are 56 Monuments of National Importance in this state.

List of state protected monuments 

|}

See also 
List of Monuments of National Importance in India, for Monuments of National Importance in India
 List of Monuments of National Importance in Jammu and Kashmir

References 

Jammu and Kashmir
State Protected Monuments
State Protected Monuments